The horror anthology series Night Gallery began on December 16, 1970 (after the television pilot for the series was aired on November 8, 1969) and ended on May 27, 1973, with three seasons and 43 episodes. It was created by Rod Serling and broadcast on NBC. This list does not include the 25 episodes of The Sixth Sense which were edited into Night Gallery for syndication.

Series overview

Episodes
Most episodes include multiple story segments.

Pilot: 1969

Season 1: 1970–71
Season 1 episodes are 60 minute time slot.

Season 2: 1971–72
Season 2 episodes are 60 minute time slot.

Season 3: 1972–73
Season 3 changed to a 30 minute format. Previously, Night Gallery was a 60 minute program.

Syndication-only segments
These segments were produced for season 2 but were not aired during the original broadcast run.

Unproduced scripts
Throughout the run of the series, several scripts and stories (most of which were written or adapted by Serling) were considered and were either rejected or left unproduced for various reasons.

"A Gentleman from Prague"
Based on a short story by Stephen Grendon, the story involves a man named Simon Dekrugh arriving home in Britain after traveling on the continent, he calls his business associate, Abel Speers, and when the latter arrives they examine and discuss a gold chain that Dekrugh stole from a grave in Europe; then the occupant of the grave turns up.

"No Such Thing as a Vampire"
Based on a short story by Richard Matheson, In a small town in Transylvania, a Doctor's wife discovers puncture marks on her neck, fears abound that she is being attacked by a vampire. (Note: the story was later adapted as a segment in the 1977 film, Dead of Night).

"Does The Name Grimsby Do Anything to You?" - Written By Rod Serling
The story delves into the delicate psyche of an astronaut, driven by his Type-A zeal to be the first man to walk on the lunar surface, but he unravels when he finds, and destroys, evidence during his moon walk that he was, in fact, second to an obscure and discredited scientist from a century earlier.  (Note: Although presented during the early planning stages for the show, the idea was jettisoned, but Serling later developed it into a short story and included it in the 1971 book, "Night Gallery").

"Let Me Live in a House"
Based on a story by Chad Oliver, the story dealt with questions of existence and identity, the kafkaesque "puppets on a stage" concept, a concept previously explored on The Twilight Zone.

"Nightmare Morning" 
An adaptation of Robert A. Heinlein's "They", A delusional patient in a New York hospital who believes his reality has been manufactured by an alien culture as a zoo environment for him, earth's last survivor; his delusion turns out to be real.

"Reflections"
An inferior retread of "The Cemetery".

"Let Me Tell You about the Dead"
Based on Graham Greene's "A Little Place off the Edgware Road", it tells of a man named Craven, who tries to convince others of his delusion that the dead have been rising from their graves; in a second story thread, there is a ripper-type killer on the loose. Both story threads merge when Craven meets one of the ripper's victims, zombified, in a darkened movie theater.

"Quartette Doomed"
A thinly disguised take on Agatha Christie's "And Then There Were None", stocked with characters out of a poor radio drama: the loudmouthed Texas Oil Man, The Effete Society Columnist, The Obsequious Backstabbing Assistant, The Gold-Digging Ex-Chorus Liner; they are invited to witness the reading of a dead mystic's will, instead of bequeathing to them his riches, he hands them all death sentences for their part in ruining his life. For the rest of the play, the four characters try to avoid the circumstances of their demise.

"The Onlooker" - Written By Rod Serling
Follows the story of a cold-eyed hit man who loses his professional cool, then his life, when he tries to escape a mysterious man who dogs his trail, Death.

"How Does Your Garden Grow"
An adaptation of John Collier's short story "Green Thoughts", a well-written character study involving an old gardener, his cat, a pair of dotty neighbors, a young girl claiming to be the widow of the old gardener's dead son, and a man-eating plant.

"The View Of Whatever" - Written By Rod Serling
Tells the story of Joe Sprague, who suffers the loss of his only son during the Vietnam War. In deep depression, he develops a desperate desire to escape from a present he hates. Taking form as a strange delusion, he claims that his childhood past can be viewed from his bedroom window, which is a portal into 1930s Binghamton, New York. The despairing Sprague takes his chance and steps through the window, to find himself ten years old and in that summer. Ultimately, He looks pensively into the camera as the viewer dissolve to the present from which he escaped. Spragues family is distraught at finding him missing. Sprague's family doctor, Ike Colby tries to console them, but as he looks out Sprague's bedroom window, the portal shows him his own past: a wave-lapped shore in a tropical setting and a familiar, dark-haired woman beckoning. As the vision fades, Colby finds comfort in knowing that Joe Sprague has finally gone home.

"Where Seldom Is Heard" - written by Gene Kearney
A mere vignette, an extended sketch with its punch line turning on hunchbacked bell ringer Quasimodo's deafness.

References

External links

Sources
 

Lists of anthology television series episodes
Lists of fantasy television series episodes